"Still Ballin" is a song by American rapper Tupac Shakur from the 2002 posthumous album Better Dayz. The song was released as a promo single in 2003 and features Trick Daddy. It is part two of the song "Str8 Ballin" from the album Thug Life Vol. 1. On the album, Better Dayz, the song is listed under the name "Still Ballin' (Nitty Remix)", due to the song not being the original version. The original version, produced by Johnny "J" and featuring Kurupt, was recorded in 1995 during the All Eyez on Me sessions and has never been officially released.

A different remix of "Still Ballin was made by DJ Fatal which features the original verses of both Tupac and Kurupt. Two of the verses from the original song are also featured on The Game's "How We Do" remix.

Track listing
Credits adapted from the single's liner notes.

Notes
Suge Knight and Afeni Shakur were credited as executive producers for the single.

Charts
"Still Ballin peaked in 2003 at #31 on the Billboard Top R&B/Hip-Hop Singles & Tracks chart, #15 on the Billboard Hot Rap Tracks chart, #24 on the Billboard Rhythmic Top 40 chart, and #69 on the Billboard Hot 100 chart.

Weekly charts

Year-end charts

References

2003 singles
Tupac Shakur songs
Trick Daddy songs
Songs released posthumously
Songs written by Tupac Shakur
Gangsta rap songs